Henry Sabin (October 23, 1829 – March 22, 1918) was an Iowa educator.

Biography
Henry Sabin was born in Pomfret, Connecticut on October 23, 1829. He entered Amherst College and graduated in 1852.  He was a superintendent of public schools and a member of the State Teachers' Association.  As a Republican nominee, he served as the State Superintendent of Public Instruction from 1887 to 1892, and again from 1893 until his retirement in 1898.

He was the father of writer Edwin L. Sabin.

He died at his home in Chula Vista, California on March 22, 1918.

Schools named for Henry Sabin
At least two schools have been named for Henry Sabin:
Henry Sabin Elementary, Clinton, Iowa
Henry Sabin Elementary, Iowa City, Iowa

References

 Engelhardt, Carroll. "Henry Sabin (1829 - 1918)." The Annal of Iowa  48 (1987), 388 - 412.

Amherst College alumni
Iowa Superintendents of Public Instruction
1829 births
1918 deaths
People from Pomfret, Connecticut
Iowa Republicans
19th-century American educators
People from Chula Vista, California
19th-century American politicians